WSBS can refer to:

WSBS (AM), an AM radio station located in Great Barrington, Massachusetts
WSBS-TV, a television station located in Florida
Wellington Street bus station
Watson School of Biological Sciences, a graduate school at Cold Spring Harbor Laboratory
White Sea Biological Station